The 2016 Swiss Open Grand Prix Gold was the fifth Grand Prix's badminton tournament of the 2016 BWF Grand Prix and Grand Prix Gold. The tournament was held at the St. Jakobshalle in Basel, Switzerland on 15–20 March 2016 and had a total purse of $120,000.

Men's singles

Seeds

  Lee Chong Wei (withdrawn)
  Chou Tien-chen (quarterfinals)
  Srikanth Kidambi (withdrawn)
  Wang Zhengming (second round)
  Kashyap Parupalli (withdrawn)
  Rajiv Ouseph (third round)
  Marc Zwiebler (final)
  Sho Sasaki (first round)
  Hsu Jen-hao (quarterfinals)
  Boonsak Ponsana (second round)
  Ajay Jayaram (second round)
  Hans-Kristian Vittinghus (withdrawn)
  H. S. Prannoy (champion)
  Xue Song (quarterfinals)
  Takuma Ueda (first round)
  Tanongsak Saensomboonsuk (quarterfinals)

Finals

Top half

Section 1

Section 2

Section 3

Section 4

Bottom half

Section 5

Section 6

Section 7

Section 8

Women's singles

Seeds

  Saina Nehwal (semifinals)
  Ratchanok Intanon (second round)
  Wang Yihan (final)
  Akane Yamaguchi (first round)
  Sun Yu (semifinals)
  P. V. Sindhu (quarterfinals)
  Sayaka Sato (quarterfinals)
  Busanan Ongbumrungpan (quarterfinals)

Finals

Top half

Section 1

Section 2

Bottom half

Section 3

Section 4

Men's doubles

Seeds

  Mohammad Ahsan / Hendra Setiawan (withdrawn)
  Chai Biao / Hong Wei (withdrawn)
  Liu Xiaolong / Qiu Zihan (second round)
  Lee Sheng-mu / Tsai Chia-hsin (final)
  Goh V Shem / Tan Wee Kiong (second round)
  Koo Kien Keat / Tan Boon Heong (semifinals)
  Takeshi Kamura / Keigo Sonoda (first round)
  Wang Yilyu / Zhang Wen (quarterfinals)

Finals

Top half

Section 1

Section 2

Bottom half

Section 3

Section 4

Women's doubles

Seeds

  Tian Qing / Zhao Yunlei (quarterfinals)
  Eefje Muskens / Selena Piek (second round)
  Naoko Fukuman / Kurumi Yonao (final)
  Vivian Hoo Kah Mun / Woon Khe Wei (quarterfinals)
  Shizuka Matsuo / Mami Naito (champion)
  Gabriela Stoeva / Stefani Stoeva (second round)
  Chen Qingchen / Jia Yifan (quarterfinals)
  Jongkonphan Kittiharakul / Rawinda Prajongjai (semifinals)

Finals

Top half

Section 1

Section 2

Bottom half

Section 3

Section 4

Mixed doubles

Seeds

  Tontowi Ahmad / Liliyana Natsir (withdrawn)
  Liu Cheng / Bao Yixin (second round)
  Xu Chen / Ma Jin (second round)
  Chris Adcock / Gabrielle Adcock (withdrawn)
  Praveen Jordan / Debby Susanto (withdrawn)
  Chan Peng Soon / Goh Liu Ying (withdrawn)
  Jacco Arends / Selena Piek (first round)
  Edi Subaktiar / Gloria Emanuelle Widjaja (second round)

Finals

Top half

Section 1

Section 2

Bottom half

Section 3

Section 4

References

External links 
 Tournament Link

Swiss Open (badminton)
BWF Grand Prix Gold and Grand Prix
Swiss Open
Swiss Open
Sports competitions in Basel